Tracey Wilkinson is an English actress primarily known for her role as Di Barker in the series Bad Girls. She joined the prison drama in Series 2 as a caring prison officer new to G-Wing, but by the end of her time on the programme in Series 7 Di was herself behind bars in the prison in which she had served as an officer, accused of murdering her second husband, corrupt Wing Governor, Jim Fenner (Jack Ellis) - though she was in fact innocent of the crime.

Tracey Wilkinson left Bad Girls in between the filming of the 2005 Christmas Special (now established as an additional episode to Series 7) and the beginning of Series 8 and the fate of Di (last seen on remand for Jim's murder) remained unresolved, though she had presumably been transferred from G-Wing.

Wilkinson is from the North East England and her acting CV includes a number of productions set in and filmed in the region, including the films Billy Elliot and Purely Belter (both 2000) and the BBC drama Our Friends in the North (1996).

She also appeared in the Inspector George Gently episode "Gently in the Night" as Margaret Bishop and in Jimmy McGovern's 1996 Television film Hillsborough as Jan Spearritt.

Her most recent film role is Lorraine in Sink (2019), written and directed by Mark Gillis.

She also acts on stage for the Royal Court, The National Theatre and The Royal Shakespeare Company.

Tracey has also made appearances in the TV Show Outlander that is shown on Starz. She portrays the Reverend Wakefield's housekeeper, Mrs Graham. In September 2016, Wilkinson appeared on Casualty as Jackie Munroe (married to Howard Munroe, portrayed by former on-screen husband James Gaddas who played Neil Grayling in Bad Girls), the mother of regular character Alicia Munroe (Chelsea Halfpenny).

Tracey’s most recent work (in 2020) is in Amazon Prime’s Carnival Row playing the part of Afissa. She also appears in the upcoming British drama film Give Them Wings.

Filmography

External links
 

Living people
English television actresses
English film actresses
Year of birth missing (living people)